Coleroa is a genus of fungi belonging to the family Venturiaceae.

The species of this genus are found in Eurasia and Northern America.

Species

Species:

Coleroa alchemillae 
Coleroa aliculariae 
Coleroa boukokoensis 
Coleroa caulicola (Rostr.) Sivan. (1977)
Coleroa chaetomium (Kunze) Rabenh. (1850)
Coleroa circinans (Fr.) G. Winter (1885)
Coleroa coffeicola Saccas (1953)
Coleroa concinna (Petr.) M.E. Barr (1989)
Coleroa crepidis Togashi & Katsuki (1952)
Coleroa daphnes Balf.-Browne (1955)
Coleroa graminis A.L. Guyot (1946)
Coleroa hageniae (Castell.) Eboh & Cain (1987)
Coleroa hepaticicola Racov. (1942)
Coleroa himalayensis (C. Bachm.) Sivan. (1977)
Coleroa inconspicua Bubák (1915)
Coleroa lebeckiae (Verwoerd & Dippen.) Arx (1962)
Coleroa maydicola Saccas (1951)
Coleroa papyricola Saccas (1953)
Coleroa plantaginis (Ellis) M.E. Barr (1968)
Coleroa polylopha (Syd.) E. Müll. (1962)
Coleroa pusiola (P. Karst.) Sivan. (1975)
Coleroa rhododendri (Tengwall) Săvul. & Eliade (1959)
Coleroa rhynchosiae (Kalchbr. & Cooke) E. Müll. (1962)
Coleroa robertiani (Fr.) E. Müll. (1962)
Coleroa rubicola (Ellis & Everh.) E. Müll. (1962)
Coleroa rubi-idaei (Höhn.) Sacc. (1928)
Coleroa senniana (Sacc.) Arx (1962)
Coleroa spinarum Höhn. (1905)
Coleroa sporoboli (H.C. Greene) M.E. Barr (1968)
Coleroa venturioides Speschnew (1904

References

Venturiaceae
Dothideomycetes genera